Thomas Clyde may refer to:

 Thomas Clyde (businessman) (1812–1885), American ship owner
 Thomas Clyde (film producer) (1917–1999), British film producer
 Thomas W. Clyde (skipjack), a Chesapeake Bay skipjack